Elections to Cookstown District Council were held on 5 May 2011 on the same day as the other Northern Irish local government elections. The election used three district electoral areas to elect a total of 16 councillors.

Election results

Note: "Votes" are the first preference votes.

Districts summary

|- class="unsortable" align="centre"
!rowspan=2 align="left"|Ward
! % 
!Cllrs
! % 
!Cllrs
! %
!Cllrs
! %
!Cllrs
! % 
!Cllrs
!rowspan=2|TotalCllrs
|- class="unsortable" align="center"
!colspan=2 bgcolor="" | Sinn Féin
!colspan=2 bgcolor="" | SDLP
!colspan=2 bgcolor="" | DUP
!colspan=2 bgcolor="" | UUP
!colspan=2 bgcolor="white"| Others
|-
|align="left"|Ballinderry
|bgcolor="#008800"|39.3
|bgcolor="#008800"|2
|22.2
|2
|19.3
|1
|12.1
|1
|7.1
|0
|6
|-
|align="left"|Cookstown Central
|bgcolor="#008800"|32.4
|bgcolor="#008800"|2
|19.9
|1
|17.6
|1
|21.7
|1
|8.4
|0
|5
|-
|align="left"|Drum Manor
|bgcolor="#008800"|44.3
|bgcolor="#008800"|2
|11.2
|1
|16.8
|1
|19.0
|1
|8.7
|0
|5
|- class="unsortable" class="sortbottom" style="background:#C9C9C9"
|align="left"| Total
|39.1
|6
|18.0
|4
|18.1
|3
|16.9
|3
|7.9
|0
|16
|-
|}

District results

Ballinderry

2005: 2 x Sinn Féin, 2 x SDLP, 1 x DUP, 1 x UUP
2011: 2 x Sinn Féin, 2 x SDLP, 1 x DUP, 1 x UUP
2005-2011 Change: No change

Cookstown Central

2005: 2 x SDLP, 1 x Sinn Féin, 1 x UUP, 1 x DUP
2011: 2 x Sinn Féin, 1 x SDLP, 1 x UUP, 1 x DUP
2005-2011 Change: Sinn Féin gain from SDLP

Drum Manor

2005: 2 x Sinn Féin, 1 x UUP, 1 x DUP, 1 x SDLP
2011: 2 x Sinn Féin, 1 x UUP, 1 x DUP, 1 x SDLP
2005-2011 Change: No change

References

Cookstown District Council elections
Cookstown